The 2008 Grand Rapids Rampage season is the 11th season for the franchise. The Rampage finished the regular season 6–10, earning them a spot in the playoffs as the 6th seed in the American Conference. In their Wild Card playoff game, the Rampage upset the Arizona Rattlers, 48–41. In the Divisional round, the Rampage won in a bigger upset against the top seeded Chicago Rush, 58–41. The Rampage's playoff run was cut short however, after losing the American Conference Championship to defending champion San Jose SaberCats, 55–81.

Standings

Regular season schedule

Playoff schedule

Coaching

Final roster

Stats

Regular season

Week 1
Bye Week

Week 2: vs. San Jose SaberCats

Week 3: vs. Chicago Rush

Week 4: at Kansas City Brigade

Week 5: vs. Los Angeles Avengers

Week 6: at New York Dragons

Week 7: vs. Orlando Predators

Week 8: at Chicago Rush

Week 9: vs. Kansas City Brigade

Week 10: at Colorado Crush

Week 11: at Dallas Desperados

Week 12: vs. Tampa Bay Storm

Week 13: at Arizona Rattlers

Week 14: vs. Utah Blaze

Week 15: vs. Colorado Crush

Week 16: at Columbus Destroyers

Week 17: at New Orleans VooDoo

Playoffs

American Conference Wild Card: at (3) Arizona Rattlers

American Conference Divisional: at (1) Chicago Rush

American Conference Championship: vs. (2) San Jose SaberCats

Grand Rapids Rampage
Grand Rapids Rampage seasons
2008 in sports in Michigan